Weir River may refer to:

Australia 

 Weir River (Queensland), Australia, a tributary of Barwon River
 Weir River, Queensland, a locality in the Western Downs Region, Australia

United States 

Weir River (Massachusetts), U.S., which ends in Boston Harbor
Weir River (Manitoba), a tributary of the Nelson River
Weir River, Manitoba, a settlement on the river